The 2017 Pekao Szczecin Open was a professional tennis tournament played on clay courts. It was the 25th edition of the tournament which was part of the 2017 ATP Challenger Tour. It took place in Szczecin, Poland between 9 and 17 September 2017.

Singles main-draw entrants

Seeds

1 Rankings are as of 28 August 2017.

Other entrants
The following players received wildcards into the singles main draw:
  Adrian Andrzejczuk
  Karol Drzewiecki
  Richard Gasquet
  Marcin Gawron

The following players received entry into the singles main draw as special exempts:
  Julien Cagnina
  Jürgen Zopp

The following players received entry from the qualifying draw:
  Guillermo Durán
  Artem Smirnov
  Robin Staněk
  Maxime Tabatruong

The following players received entry as lucky losers:
  Aliaksandr Bury
  Marek Jaloviec
  Constant Lestienne

Champions

Singles

 Richard Gasquet def.  Florian Mayer 7–6(7–3), 7–6(7–4).

Doubles

 Wesley Koolhof /  Artem Sitak def.  Aliaksandr Bury /  Andreas Siljeström 6–1, 7–5.

External links
Official Website

2017
2017 ATP Challenger Tour
2017 in Polish tennis